Kenny de Schepper was the defending champion, but lost in the first round to Dustin Brown.

Radek Štěpánek won the title, defeating Igor Sijsling in the final, 6–3, 7–5.

Seeds

Draw

Finals

Top half

Bottom half

References
 Main Draw
 Qualifying Draw

Ethias Trophy - Singles
2013 Ethias Trophy